The 1993 Vuelta a Murcia was the ninth edition of the Vuelta a Murcia cycle race and was held on 9 March to 14 March 1993. The race started and finished in Murcia. The race was won by Carlos Galarreta.

General classification

References

1993
1993 in road cycling
1993 in Spanish sport